Elias Carter (1781-1864) was an American architect whose first church design, at Brimfield, Massachusetts, was completed in 1805. He was born in 1781 to Timothy and Sarah (Walker) Carter in Ward, a village of Auburn, Massachusetts. His father, a builder, died when he was three, and the family moved to Hardwick when his mother remarried, to a farmer there. He followed in his father's profession, working in the American South for a time before returning to central Massachusetts. He was responsible for the construction of a number of churches in central Massachusetts, which an early biographer described as "typical white steepled churches of New England". His most influential design appears to have been the church in Templeton, Massachusetts, which inspired the design of at least two others. He also built houses throughout central Massachusetts, as well as a wing of the Westborough State Hospital, and played a role in the construction of the New Hampshire state insane asylum.

Many of his works are listed on the U.S. National Register of Historic Places.

Works (attribution) include:
Gov. Levi Lincoln House (1834), 4 Avalon Pl., Worcester, MA, NRHP-listed
Salisbury House (1836–38), 61 Harvard St., Worcester, MA, NRHP-listed. Designed by Carter or by Isaiah Rogers (sources disagree)
Dowley-Taylor House (1842), 770 Main St., Worcester, MA, NRHP-listed
Small House (1846), 156 Rogers Ave., Macon, GA, NRHP-listed
Horatio Tower House (1848), 71 Pleasant St., Worcester, MA, NRHP-listed
Acworth Congregational Church, north end of town common, Acworth, NH, NRHP-listed
Church of Christ Congregational, 235 State Street, Granby, MA
Domingos House, 1261 Jefferson Ter., Macon, GA, NRHP-listed
Leroy Napier House, 2215 Napier Ave., Macon, GA, NRHP-listed
Third Fitzwilliam Meetinghouse, Village Green, Fitzwilliam, NH, NRHP-listed
Westborough State Hospital, along Lyman St. north of Chauncy Lake and jct. of South St. and MA 9, Westborough, MA (Carter, Elias), NRHP-listed
One or more works in Barre Common District, bounded roughly by South, Exchange, Main, Pleasant, Broad, School and Grove Sts., Barre, MA, NRHP-listed
One or more works in Brimfield Center Historic District, Main St., Brookfield, Wales, Sturbridge and Warren Rds., Brimfield, MA, NRHP-listed
One or more works in Macon Historic District (Macon, Georgia), NRHP-listed
One or more works in Mendon Center Historic District, roughly bounded by Main, Hastings, Maple, North, Washington & George Sts., Mendon, MA, NRHP-listed
One or more works in Rabbit Hill Historic District, roughly bounded by Highland, Main, Franklin, and Milford Sts.,	Medway, MA, NRHP-listed
One or more works in Templeton Common Historic District, Athol, Gardner, Hubbardston, Dudley, Wellington, and South Rds., Templeton, MA, NRHP-listed

References

19th-century American architects
Architects from Massachusetts
Architects from Worcester, Massachusetts
1781 births
1864 deaths
People from Auburn, Massachusetts